The first season of the sitcom Full House originally aired on ABC from September 22, 1987 to May 6, 1988.

Premise
In the first season, after Danny Tanner's wife Pam dies, Jesse (Danny's brother-in-law), and Joey (Danny's best friend since childhood) move in to help him to raise his three daughters, D. J., Stephanie, and Michelle.
D. J. starts fifth grade and Stephanie enters kindergarten.

Main characters 
 John Stamos as Jesse Cochran
 Bob Saget as Danny Tanner
 David Coulier as Joey Gladstone
 Candace Cameron as D. J. Tanner
 Jodie Sweetin as Stephanie Tanner
 Mary-Kate and Ashley Olsen as Michelle Tanner

Episodes

Reception
The season received generally negative reviews from critics. On Metacritic, it holds a score of 31 out of 100, based on 7 critics, indicating "generally unfavorable" reviews. ABC almost cancelled the series after the season concluded.

See also 
 List of Full House episodes

References 

General references 
 
 

 

1987 American television seasons
1988 American television seasons
1